Collemezzano is a village in Tuscany, central Italy, administratively a frazione of the comune of Cecina, province of Livorno. At the time of the 2011 census its population was 14.

Collemezzano is about 35 km from Livorno and 6 km from Cecina.

Bibliography 
 

Frazioni of the Province of Livorno